Bresci is an Italian surname. Notable people with the surname include:

 Gaetano Bresci (1869–1901), Italian anarchist
 Giulio Bresci (1921–1998), Italian road racing cyclist

See also
 Bresci Circle, group of New York City anarchists
 Brescia

Italian-language surnames